The Mitchell Micropolitan Statistical Area, as defined by the United States Census Bureau, is an area consisting of two counties in South Dakota, anchored by the city of Mitchell. As of the 2000 census, the μSA had a population of 21,880 (though a July 1, 2009 estimate placed the population at 22,482).

Counties
Davison
Hanson

Communities
Cities
Alexandria
Emery
Mitchell (Principal city)
Mount Vernon
Towns
Ethan
Farmer
Fulton
Census-designated places
Loomis
Unincorporated places
Epiphany

Demographics
As of the census of 2000, there were 21,880 people, 8,700 households, and 5,618 families residing within the μSA. The racial makeup of the μSA was 96.70% White, 0.23% African American, 1.71% Native American, 0.38% Asian, 0.02% Pacific Islander, 0.26% from other races, and 0.69% from two or more races. Hispanic or Latino of any race were 0.61% of the population.

The median income for a household in the μSA was $33,263, and the median income for a family was $41,929. Males had a median income of $28,969 versus $20,578 for females. The per capita income for the μSA was $16,329.

See also
South Dakota census statistical areas

References

 
Davison County, South Dakota
Hanson County, South Dakota